The Adventures of Freddy Lombard is a comic book series created by Yves Chaland.  Five albums were released, all during the 1980s, before Chaland's untimely death. They were originally written in French, though have since received publication into English. 

The stories feature the protagonist Freddy Lombard and his friends Dina and Sweep, as they desperately try to get money to pay their bills. This often leads them to their adventures.

Bibliography

The Will of Godfrey of Bouillon
Originally published in 1981 as Le Testament de Godefroid de Bouillon by Magic Strip publishers. In the story, the gang help discover the missing treasure of a drunken aristocrat's ancestor.

The Elephant Graveyard
Published in 1984 as Le cimetières des éléphants, by Les Humanoïdes Associés. Containing two stories: An African Adventure, about travels to the jungles of Africa in search of a unique photographic plate for a collector. The second story, The Elephants Graveyard, involves Freddy's investigations into the murders of several ex-army gentlemen who served in Africa.

The Comet of Carthage
Initially published in 1986 as La comète de Carthage, by Les Humanoïdes Associés. A reworking of an ancient story, Freddy insists on saving a Phoenician princess who has been kidnapped by a crazed artist who murdered his last model.

Holiday in Budapest
Vacances à Budapest (Holiday in Budapest) 1988, Les Humanoïdes Associés

F.52
F. 52, 1989, Les Humanoïdes Associés

Publication in English
The Adventures of Freddy Lombard are the only works by Chaland to be released in English. They were released in two compilation albums, the first containing the first three books, and the second containing the last two. They were released in hardback in 2003 and softback in 2004 and 2005. In 2015, Humanoids published the entire collection in one hardbound volume

See also 
 Yves Chaland
 Ligne claire

French comics
1981 comics debuts
Adventure comics
Humor comics
1990 comics endings